Westminster Christian Academy is a Christian private school with campuses located in Opelousas, Louisiana and Lafayette, Louisiana.

The school officially opened in 1978.  WCA is accredited by the Association of Christian Schools International.  Tuition ranges from $4,655-$6,280 depending on the grade. The school goes for 175 days a year for 7 hours a day.

Campuses
While Opelousas is the main campus, Westminster opened two campuses in Lafayette; the first opened in 1989 and only goes to 6th grade, while the other campus opened in 2010 and serves K3 and K4.

Athletics
Westminster Christian Academy athletics competes in the LHSAA 1A classification. The current athletic director is Robert Turnage.

External links
 School website

Private high schools in Louisiana
Schools in Lafayette, Louisiana
Schools in St. Landry Parish, Louisiana
Private middle schools in Louisiana
Private elementary schools in Louisiana
Opelousas, Louisiana